Hapalodectidae (literal translation 'soft biters':  ('soft, tender'),  ('biter')) is an extinct family of relatively small-bodied mesonychian placental mammals from the Paleocene and Eocene of North America and Asia. Hapalodectids differ from the larger and better-known mesonychids by having teeth specialized for cutting (presumably meat), while the teeth of other mesonychids, such as Mesonyx or Sinonyx, are more specialized for crushing bones. Hapalodectids were once considered a subfamily of the Mesonychidae, but the discovery of a skull of Hapalodectes hetangensis showed additional differences justifying placement in a distinct family. In particular, H. hetangensis has a postorbital bar closing the back of the orbit, a feature lacking in mesonychids. The skeleton of hapalodectids is poorly known, and of the postcranial elements, only the humerus has been described. The morphology of this bone indicates less specialization for terrestrial locomotion than in mesonychids.

Species
Family Hapalodectidae
Genus Hapalodectes
 H. anthracinus Zhou et Gingerich, 1991
 H. dux Lopatin, 1999
 H. hetangensis Ting et Li, 1987
 H. huanghaiensis Tong et Wang, 2006
 H. leptognathus Osborn et Wortman, 1892
 H. lopatini Solé et al., 2017
 H. paleocenus Beard et al., 2010
 H. serus Matthew et Granger, 1925
Genus Hapalorestes
H. lovei
Genus Honanodon
H. chow
H. hebetis
H. lushiensis
H. macrodontus
Genus Lohoodon
L. lushiensis
Genus Metahapalodectes
M. makhchinus

References

Mesonychids
Eocene extinctions
Paleocene first appearances
Prehistoric mammal families